Ivan Nikolayevich Zynin (born 7 July 1993) is a Russian football player.

He made his debut in the Russian Football National League for FC Shinnik Yaroslavl on 8 November 2014 in a game against FC Volga Nizhny Novgorod.

References

External links
 Profile by Russian Football National League

1993 births
Living people
Russian footballers
FC Shinnik Yaroslavl players
Association football midfielders